Bernard Collins (born 18 May 1981) is an Irish former Gaelic footballer who played for club side Castlehaven and at inter-county level with the Cork senior football team. He also spent two seasons playing Australian rules football with Western Bulldogs.

Career
Collins first came to Gaelic football prominence with the Castlehaven team that won the County Under-21 Championship title in 1998. He subsequently progressed onto the club's senior team and added a senior medal to his collection in 2003. Collins also lined out in all grades with Cork. After Munster Championship success in the minor grade in 1999, he had a brief tenure with the under-21 team before being drafted onto the Cork senior team in 2000. Collins later spent a number of seasons playing Australian rules football with Western Bulldogs in Melbourne. He returned to Ireland afterwards, rejoined the Cork senior team and was a substitute when Cork were beaten by Kerry in the 2007 All-Ireland final.

Honours
Castlehaven
Cork Senior Football Championship: 2003
Cork Under-21 Football Championship: 1998

Cork
Munster Minor Football Championship: 1999

References

1981 births
Living people
Castlehaven Gaelic footballers
Cork inter-county Gaelic footballers
Western Bulldogs players
Gaelic football selectors
Irish players of Australian rules football